The Jammeh Foundation for Peace (JFP) is an independent, non-political, charitable organization based in the Gambia, West Africa. The Foundation was founded by Gambia President Yahya Jammeh.

Mission

The mission of the Foundation is to implement substantial and sustainable improvements in the quality of life for the people of 
The Gambia. To accomplish this, the Foundation provides programs in:

 Education
 Health
 Agriculture
 Women's issues
 Youth development

History

The Foundation is the brainchild of the Gambian President, Alhaji Yahya Jammeh and the First Lady of the Gambia, Madam Zineb Yahya Jammeh. It was launched in May 1999. First Lady Jammeh serves as the President of the Foundation.

News

In May 2011, the national Gambia Police Force (GPF) gave a substantial donation to the Foundation.  The GPF, in a ceremony at 
Police Headquarters in Banjul, donated 31 bags of farm produce, including 7 bags of groundnuts, 7 bags of coos, 11 bags of maize and 6 bags of rice.

In September 2011, Saudi Arabian Princess Ameera bint Aidan bin Nayef Al-Taweel visited the Gambia and toured the Foundation. The Foundation donated $500,000 for the construction of a health diagnostic center. During her tour, Princess Ameera pledged a $100,000 donation to the Foundation.

After Jammeh was removed from power, Reuters released a report on 24 February 2017 in which it stated that funds from the Jammeh Foundation for Peace went to Jammeh himself, not to the foundation's projects.

References

External links
Jammeh Foundation for Peace web site
The Gambia and its President on the Road to a Prospering Future Google Books summary

Peace organizations by country
Organisations based in the Gambia